The Type 83 is a 152 mm self-propelled howitzer used by the People's Liberation Army of China.

This self-propelled gun system was developed by Factory 674 (Harbin First Machinery Building Group Ltd) and based on a tracked chassis. The project's development started in the late 1970s and the prototype was completed in February 1980, followed by a second in 1981. Production was authorized in 1983 under the designation Type 83. The first production run started in May 1983 and the first public display was on 1 October 1984.
This self-propelled gun is similar to the 2S3, with a modified version of the Type 66 gun and a Type 321 utility tracked chassis and is the first modern self-propelled gun in service with the People's Liberation Army. Production ended in 1990, after only 78 examples were built. Manufacturing also involved factory 5318 (artillery), 298 (aiming), 754 and 843.

Unlike the U.S. M109 howitzer, this self-propelled gun is made from steel and not aluminum alloy. It has six wheels on each side with the engine is in the forward hull. There is stowage for 30 shells, included a Chinese version of the Krasnopol laser ammunition. The elevation is 0-62° giving a range of 17 km. There is also base-bleed ammunition with improved range, cluster and fragmentation projectiles. A secondary weapon, a 12.7 mm machine gun, is also mounted on the turret. The engine is a 520 hp (382 kW) WR4B-12V150LB four-stroke, liquid-cooled diesel engine. The maximum speed is 55 km/h and range 450 km.

The typical Chinese artillery regiment (one for each armoured division) has 18 SPG organized as one battalion with three batteries. Not long after entering service it was determined to be obsolescent and China started to develop new systems, like the PLZ-45 (mainly for international market) and the real Type 83's replacement, the PLZ-05.

Operators

 People's Liberation Army Ground Force - 150 PLZ-82/83

References

 Type 83 152MM SELF-PROPELLED GUN-HOWITZER, retrieved 29 set 09

152 mm artillery
Tracked self-propelled howitzers
Self-propelled artillery of the People's Republic of China
Military vehicles introduced in the 1980s